In 2001, the new city of Hamilton was formed. The Regional Municipality of Hamilton-Wentworth and its six local municipalities; Ancaster, Dundas, Flamborough, Glanbrook, Hamilton and Stoney Creek amalgamated. (January 1) Before amalgamation, the "old" City of Hamilton was made up of 100 neighbourhoods. Today in the new megacity, there are over 200 designated neighbourhoods. The first four neighbourhoods in Hamilton were Beasley, Central, Durand and Corktown.
Below is a list of some of the more noteworthy neighbourhoods found in the city of Hamilton:

Lower City (below Escarpment)
 Ainslie Wood  is centered on Alexander Park and located near McMaster University. It is bordered to the north by Main Street and Dundas, to the south and east by Highway 403, and to the west by Dundas and Ancaster.
 Bartonville
 Hamilton Beach
 Beasley, named after Richard Beasley (1761-1842), soldier, political figure, farmer and businessman in Upper Canada.
 Blakely
 Central, Downtown core + site of Hess Village and Jamesville, which is shared by the Italian & Portuguese communities of Hamilton. Little Racalmuto (Italian) A rich Italian history, where an entire village in southern Italy—Racalmuto—immigrated and settled in Hamilton. Today the Italian heritage is strong and is shared with a neighbouring Portuguese population.
 Chedoke Park B
 Cherry Heights
 Community Beach
 Cootes Paradise A
 Cootes Paradise B
 Corktown, Irish settlement on the south east side of downtown.
 Corman
 Crown Point East
 Crown Point West
 Delta East
 Delta West, where King and Main Streets (normally parallel) intersect.
 Dundas
  Durand, historically was home to the 'industrialists'. This south of downtown neighbourhood is quite possibly the largest concentration of early 20c castles/mansions in Canada. The grand homes were home to the families whose names graced the signs of the north end factories. Named after James Durand, businessman and political figure in Upper Canada. (Hamilton) 
 Gibson, named after Hamiltonian, Sir John Morison Gibson, (1842-1929), who was Lieutenant Governor of Ontario from 1908 to 1914.
 Glenview East
 Glenview West
 Grayside
 Greenford
 Greenhill
 Homeside
  International Village
 Keith (Burlington and Wentworth area)
  Kirkendall North
  Kirkendall South
 Lakely
 Landsdale
 McQuesten East, named after Thomas McQuesten, (1882-1948), lawyer, politician and government appointee who helped McMaster University to relocate from Toronto to west Hamilton in 1930.
 McQuesten West
 Nashdale
 Normanhurst
 The North End
 Parkview East
 Parkview West
 Red Hill
 Riverdale East
 Riverdale West
 Rockton, Ontario
 Rosedale (bound by the Escarpment, Lawrence, Red Hill Express, Kenilworth)
 St. Clair
 Stinson, Named after Thomas Stinson, (1798-1864), merchant, banker, landowner. He was an extensive landowner in not only in Hamilton but as well as Chicago, St. Paul, Minnesota, and Superior City, Wisconsin, which he named.
 Stipeley
 Stoney Creek, (locally known as the "Crick" or "Tony Creek" from its large Italian population. In recent years first generation Indian and Pakistani immigrants have largely settled in Stoney Creek.)
 Strathcona
 Vincent, Named after John Vincent, (1764-1848), British army officer in the Battle of Stoney Creek, War of 1812.
  Westdale, originally an upper-class, master-planned neighbourhood from the 1920s, that forbade eastern Europeans, Jews and people of colour from residing there. In later years it became a Jewish neighbourhood with one of Hamilton's three Jewish synagogues. (Another is in nearby Ainslie Wood.) Built around oval streets that surround the centre Westdale Village.
 Winona
 Winona Park

Mountain (Escarpment)

 Allison
 Ancaster Village
 Ainslie Wood
 Albion Falls
 Balfour, named after James Balfour, (1854-1917), architect, Canada Life Assurance Company building at corner of King & James (1883), City Hall on corner of James & York (1888). The Balfour neighbourhood on the Hamilton Mountain was named after him. It is bounded by Fennell Avenue East (north), Mohawk Road East (south), Upper James Street (west) and Upper Wellington Street (east). Notable landmarks in this neighbourhood include the Mountain Plaza Mall and Norwood Park.
 Barnstown
 Berrisfield
 Binbrook
 Birdland, a neighborhood on the central mountain where all the streets have been named after local birds.
 Bonnington
 Broughton East
 Broughton West
 Bruleville
 Buchanan, named after Isaac Buchanan, businessman and political figure in Canada West (Hamilton).
 Burkhome
 Butler, named after Richard Butler, (1834-1925), editor, publisher, journalist.
 Carpenter
 Centremount
 Chapel East
 Chapel West
 Crerar, named after Harry Crerar, who was a Canadian general and the country's "leading field commander" in World War II.
 Duff's Corners, named after Lockhart Duff, (1793-1858), landowner, his house was demolished at this site to make way for a service station.
 Eastmount
 Eleanor
 Elfrida
 Falkirk East
 Falkirk West
 Fessenden, named after Clementina Trenholme, (1844-1918), Clementina (Fessenden) Trenholme, author, social organizer. Also, mother of Reginald Fessenden, the radio pioneer. Had two neighbourhoods named after her, Fessenden and Trenholme, both on the Hamilton Mountain.
 Flamborough
 Gilbert
 Gilkson
 Mount Hope, (site of John C. Munro International Airport).
 Gourley
 Greeningdon
 Greensville
 Gurnett
 Hampton Heights
 Hannon North
 Hannon South
 Hannon West
 Harmony Hall
 Heritage Green
 Hill Park
 Huntington
 Inch Park, named after Adam Inch, (1857-1933), dairy farmer, politician.
 Jerome
 Kennedy
 Kernighan, named after Robert Kirkland Kernighan, (1854-1926), poet, journalist.
 King's Forest Upper
 Lawfield
 Leckie Park, named after Campbell Leckie, (1848-1925), engineer.
 Lisgar
 Macassa
 Meadowlands
 Mewburr
 Mountview
 Millgrove
 Mohawk
 North Glanford
 Oakhill
 Pleasant Valley
 Quinndale
 Raleigh
 Randall
 Rolston
 Rushdale
 Ryckman's, One of two neighbourhoods named after Samuel Ryckman, (1777-1846), farmer, surveyor. Constructed a log house and a barn on the present-day Ryckmans Corners.
 Ryckman's Corners, One of two neighbourhoods named after Samuel Ryckman, (1777-1846), farmer, surveyor. Constructed a log house and a barn on the present-day Ryckmans Corners.
 Rymal Station
 Sherwood
 Southam, named after William Southam, (1843-1932), publisher, philanthropist.
 Sunninghill
 Templemead
 Thorner
 Trenholme, named after Clementina Trenholme, (1844-1918), Clementina (Fessenden) Trenholme, author, social organizer. Also, mother of Reginald Fessenden, the radio pioneer. Had two neighbourhoods named after her, Fessenden and Trenholme, both on the Hamilton Mountain.
 Twenty Place
 Waterdown
 West Flamborough
 Westcliffe
 Yeoville

References

 Weaver, John C. (1985). Hamilton: an illustrated history. James Lorimer & Company, Publishers,

External links
Ainslie Wood Community Association
Stinson Community Association (www.stinsoncommunity.ca)
Beasley Neighbourhood (ourbeasley.com)

Inch/Eastmount Hub
 Durand neighbourhood
Kirkendall
International Village
North End Neighbours
South Stipeley Neighbourhood Association
Westdale Village

Hamilton, Ontario